2021 CPL might refer to:

2021 Caribbean Premier League, cricket competition
2021 Canadian Premier League season, soccer competition